South Bank is an area of York in the county of North Yorkshire, England. It is to the south of the River Ouse. It was home to the now-closed Terry's Chocolate Works.

The Chocolate Works factory opened in 1926, where over the years it manufactured Terry's Chocolate Orange, Terry's All Gold and York Fruits. Terry's was acquired by Kraft Foods in 1993, who decided in 2004 to switch production of remaining products All Gold and Chocolate Orange to factories in Belgium, Sweden, Poland and Slovakia, and close the plant. The factory closed on 30 September 2005, with the loss of 317 jobs.

Located near the factory is York Racecourse, which forms part of the larger Knavesmire. There is an Athletics Club, the Knavesmire Harriers, who train in this area. South Bank is also the location of Rowntree Park, which is situated near the River Ouse. The Millennium Bridge, which links South Bank to Fishergate and Fulford on the other side of the river, was completed in 2001 at a cost of £4.2 million.

Knavesmire Primary School opened in 1914 and is the main primary school in the area. Millthorpe School was formerly a specialist language college and converted to academy status in April 2016.

The main Catholic secondary school in the area (and in York as a whole) is the "outstanding" All Saints RC School which also houses the only Sixth Form in the area. It has two sites, the upper site (which is host to years 10-13) is located between Tadcaster Road, Albemarle Road, Scarcroft Hill and Scarcroft Road.

St Chad's Greys is the local Scout Group.  It was formed in 1926 and is one of the largest groups in York and one of only three groups in North Yorkshire which have a Scout Band.

Location

(All walk times calculated by GPS from South Bank Avenue)

20 minutes' walk or 5 minutes by bicycle to York railway station
18 minutes' walk or 4 minutes by bicycle to York City Centre
14 minutes' walk or 3 minutes by bicycle to the York greenbelt along the River Ouse
7 minutes' walk or 1 minute by bicycle to York Racecourse
The York to Selby cycle path (Distance: 15 miles one way) starts from near York Racecourse.
6 minutes' walk or 1 minute by bicycle to the proposed luxury development at the old Terry's Chocolate Factory

Gallery

References

Villages and areas in the City of York